Kiara Muhammad (born December 16, 1998) is an American actress.

Muhammad was born on December 16, 1998, in Boston, Massachusetts. At a young age, she started her career by being in photoshoots for Reebok.

Muhammad voiced the main character in Doc McStuffins in the first 2 seasons of the series. In 2012, the show was the most popular preschool TV series for girls aged 3–5.

Filmography

Film

Television

References

External links

Living people
Actresses from Boston
American television actresses
American stage actresses
1998 births
American child actresses
American child singers
African-American actresses
American film actresses
American voice actresses
21st-century American singers
21st-century American actresses
21st-century African-American women singers